Zonca was an Italian professional cycling team that existed from 1970 to 1979.

The team was selected to race in eight editions of the Giro d'Italia, where they achieved four stage wins.

Major victories
 Trofeo Matteotti : Davide Boifava (1972)
 Tour de Berne : Roland Salm (1974, 1975)
 Giro del Friuli : Franco Bitossi (1976)
 Coppa Sabatini : Piero Spinelli (1976), Leonardo Mazzantini (1979)
 Giro della Provincia di Reggio Calabria : Constantino Conti (1977)
 Milano–Torino : Pierino Gavazzi (1978)
 Giro di Campania : Pierino Gavazzi (1979)

Giro d'Italia results 
 8 participations (1972–1979)
 4 stage wins:
 1, 1973 : Gianni Motta
 2, 1978 : Giancarlo Bellini, Pierino Gavazzi
 1, 1979 : Bruno Wolfer
 1 classification:
  Mountains classification : Ueli Sutter (1978)

References

Defunct cycling teams based in Italy
1970 establishments in Italy
1979 disestablishments in Italy
Cycling teams established in 1970
Cycling teams disestablished in 1979